Eresina saundersi, the Saunders' eresina, is a butterfly in the family Lycaenidae. It is found in Ivory Coast, Ghana and western Nigeria. Its habitat consists of dense, primary forests.

References

Butterflies described in 1956
Poritiinae